Mateo García Franzotti (born 3 February 2003) is an Argentine professional footballer who plays as a left-back for Unión de Santa Fe.

Club career
Born in Paraná, Entre Ríos, Franzotti developed in the academy of Unión de Santa Fe. In 2021, a Uruguayan company affiliated with German football club FC Bayern Munich contacted representatives from Argentina, requesting highlight videos for defenders. Franzotti, alongside teammate and compatriot Gerónimo Vidal, was selected to be part of the FC Bayern Munich World Squad, representing the Bavarian club in international friendlies.

Career statistics

Club

Notes

References

2003 births
Living people
People from Paraná, Entre Ríos
Argentine footballers
Association football fullbacks
Association football central defenders
Unión de Santa Fe footballers